Ağalıkənd is a village and municipality in the Bilasuvar Rayon of Azerbaijan.  It has a population of 3,848.

References 

Populated places in Bilasuvar District